This is a list of trans-Neptunian objects (TNOs), which are minor planets in the Solar System that orbit the Sun at a greater distance on average than Neptune, that is, their orbit has a semi-major axis greater than 30.1 astronomical units (AU). The Kuiper belt, scattered disk, and Oort cloud are three conventional divisions of this volume of space. , the catalog of minor planets contains 901 numbered TNOs. In addition, there are more than 3,000 unnumbered TNOs, which have been observed since 1993.

This list consists of all types of TNO subgroups: classical Kuiper belt objects, also known as "cubewanos", the resonant trans-Neptunian objects with their main and higher-order resonant subgroups, the scattered disc objects (SDOs), and the extreme trans-Neptunian objects including the ESDOs, EDDOs, and sednoids, which have a semi-major axis of at least 150 AU and a perihelion (closest approach to the Sun) greater than that of Neptune. The list also contains several centaurs, if the object's orbit has a sufficiently large semi-major axis (a). Centaurs have unstable orbits in which the perihelion (q) is well inside of Neptune's orbit but the farthest point (aphelion, Q) is very distant.

The first TNO to be discovered was Pluto in 1930. It became the namesake of a larger group of resonant objects called plutinos (another such resonant subgroup are the twotinos). It took more than 60 years to discover a second TNO, Albion (provisionally known as ), in 1992. Most TNOs have low albedos typically around 0.09. Their color varies from blue-grey to very red (classes BB, BR, IR and RR). The following list also gives an object's full designation, mean-diameter (D), and discovery circumstances (date, discoverer and discovery site), as well as its orbital inclination (i) and eccentricity (e).

List 

This list includes all numbered trans-Neptunian objects with a semi-major axis greater than 30.1 astronomical units (AU), Neptune's average orbital distance from the Sun. The data is sourced from MPC's "List of Trans Neptunian Objects" and "List Of Centaurs and Scattered-Disk Objects", completed with remarks and information from Johnston's Archive (diameter, class, binary, albedo, spectral taxonomy and B–R color index).

Unnumbered TNOs 

There are more than 3,000 unnumbered trans-Neptunian objects, defined here as minor planets with a semi-major axis larger than 30.1 AU (Neptune's average orbital distance from the Sun). The data is sourced from MPC's "List of Trans Neptunian Objects" and "List Of Centaurs and Scattered-Disk Objects", completed with information from Johnston's Archive (diameter, class, binary status, etc.). For the list of numbered TNOs, see .

Trans-Neptunian satellites 

A growing number of TNOs are revealed to be binary systems with a minor-planet moon orbiting its primary. There are also several multiple systems with more than one satellite.

Diagram: orbital classes 

Trans-Neptunian objects colorized by their orbital subclass and plotted in the orbital parameter space (eccentricity and inclination versus semi-major axis). The plot for the entire region contains 1418 objects including plutinos (#185), twotinos (#36), other resonant objects (#124), cubewanos (#420), inner (#40) and outer classical objects (#6), SDOs (#289), sednoids (#11), centaurs (#101) and other TNOs (#206).

See also 
 Lists of astronomical objects
 List of centaurs (small Solar System bodies)
 List of minor planets
 List of the brightest Kuiper belt objects
 List of Solar System objects by greatest aphelion
 List of Solar System objects most distant from the Sun
 Planet Nine

Notes

References

External links 
 How many dwarf planets are there in the outer solar system?, Michael Brown, Caltech
 OSSOS TNODB by the Outer Solar System Origins Survey
 Minor Planet Center: List of Transneptunian Objects
 Minor Planet Center: List of Centaurs and Scattered-Disk Objects
 Johnston's Archive: List of Known trans-Neptunian Objects
 Johnston's Archive: Trans-Neptunian Objects
 Known extreme outer solar system objects, Scott Sheppard, Carnegie Science Center

Lists of trans-Neptunian objects

Neptunian, trans